AS Douanes, a shorted version of Association Sportive Douanes, may refer to:

AS Douanes (Togo), a football club in Lomé
AS Douanes (Senegal), a football club in Dakar
AS Douanes (basketball), a basketball club in Dakar
AS Douanes (Mauritania)
AS Douanes (Niger), a football club in Niamey
AS Douanes (Burkina Faso), a football club in Ouagadougou

See also
 Douanes (disambiguation)
 Racing de Casablanca, Morocco, named Association des Douanes Marocains from 1969 to the 1980s